Persicula weberi is a species of sea snail, a marine gastropod mollusk, in the family Cystiscidae.

References

weberi
Gastropods described in 1958
Cystiscidae